A holdfast or hold fast is a means by which artillery is fixed firmly to the ground.

One type of holdfast is a concrete base or plinth that a gun is bolted to. These were used, for example, to secure coastal battery guns in pillboxes during World War II.

References 

Artillery components